Wayne Alphonsus Collins (born 15 January 1949) is a Canadian former radio journalist and politician. Originally from Newfoundland and Labrador, he worked primarily in Prince Edward Island.

Journalism
Collins worked for the Canadian Broadcasting Corporation, hosting Island Morning on CBCT-FM in Charlottetown from 1983 until April 2003.

Political office
Following his retirement, Collins joined the Prince Edward Island Progressive Conservative Party and was nominated as the party's candidate for the electoral district of Winsloe-West Royalty in the summer of 2003.  He was elected as a member of the Legislative Assembly of Prince Edward Island in the 2003 general election held on September 29 and served until his defeat in 2007.

References

Living people
Canadian radio hosts
Progressive Conservative Party of Prince Edward Island MLAs
People from Newfoundland (island)
21st-century Canadian politicians
1949 births